The , legally referred to as , is an aerial tramway line in Gose, Nara, Japan. The line is the only aerial tramway line in Japan that is directly owned and operated by a major private railway company, the Kintetsu Railway. Opened in 1967, the line climbs Mount Yamato Katsuragi.

Basic data
System: Aerial tramway, 3 cables
Cable length: 
Vertical interval: 
Maximum gradient: 30°48′
Operational speed: 5.0 m/s
Passenger capacity per a cabin: 51
Cabins: 2
Stations: 2
Time required for single ride: 5 minutes

See also
List of aerial lifts in Japan

External links
 

Aerial tramways in Japan
Katsuragi Ropeway
Tourist attractions in Nara Prefecture
Transport in Nara Prefecture
1967 establishments in Japan